The razorbelly minnows are a group of fish in the genus Salmostoma found in southern Asia. They have been placed in the genus Salmophasia but this is regarded as a junior synonym of Salmostoma.

Species 
There are currently 13 recognized species in this genus:
 Salmostoma acinaces (Valenciennes, 1844) (silver razorbelly minnow)
 Salmostoma bacaila (F. Hamilton, 1822) (large razorbelly minnow)
 Salmostoma balookee (Sykes, 1839) (Bloch razorbelly minnow)
 Salmostoma belachi (Jayaraj, Krishna Rao, Ravichandra Reddy, Shakuntala & Devaraj, 1999)
 Salmostoma boopis (F. Day, 1874) (Boopis razorbelly minnow)
 Salmostoma horai (Silas, 1951) (Hora razorbelly minnow)
 Salmostoma novacula (Valenciennes, 1840) (Novacula razorbelly minnow)
 Salmostoma orissaensis (Bănărescu, 1968) (Orissa razorbelly minnow)
 Salmostoma phulo (F. Hamilton, 1822) (finescale razorbelly minnow)
 Salmostoma punjabense (F. Day, 1872) (Punjab razorbelly minnow)
 Salmostoma sardinella (Valenciennes, 1844) (Sardinella razorbelly minnow)
 Salmostoma sladoni (F. Day, 1870)
 Salmostoma untrahi (F. Day, 1869) (Mahanadi razorbelly minnow)

References 

 
Fish of Asia